King's Printer for Ontario (known as Queen's Printer for Ontario during the reign of a female monarch) is the agent responsible for publishing government documents, and copyrighted materials belonging to the Government of Ontario.

Documents printed by the King's Printer include:

 Holds copyright in Ontario statutes, regulations and judicial decisions including the Revised Statutes of Ontario
 Official Road Map of Ontario - issued 1923 by the then Department of Public Works and Highways and now by MTO
 Documents for the Education Quality and Accountability Office(EQAO) - http://www.eqao.com/

External links
 Copyright Information: © King's Printer for Ontario

Canadian printers
Ontario law